The Wagga Wagga Express and Murrumbidgee District Advertiser was an English language newspaper published in Wagga Wagga, New South Wales.  It was the first newspaper to be published in Wagga Wagga, and was in circulation from 1858 to 1939.

History
The newspaper was first published on 30 October 1858 by James Thorburn Brown, predating The Daily Advertiser by ten years. The paper changed name several times and ceased publication in 1939.

The Wagga Wagga Express offices were destroyed by fire on 14 February 1892 with only the account books being rescued from the blaze.

Digitisation
The newspaper has been digitised as part of the Australian Newspapers Digitisation Program project hosted by the National Library of Australia.

See also
 List of newspapers in New South Wales
 List of newspapers in Australia

References

Further reading
 Holden, W Sprague 1961, Australia goes to press, Melbourne University Press, Melbourne.
 Mayer, Henry 1964, The press in Australia, Lansdowne Press, Melbourne.
 Walker, R B 1976, The newspaper press in New South Wales 1803-1920, Sydney University Press, Sydney.
 Burch, Geoff 2012, Some History of The Wagga Wagga Express

External links
 
 
 
 

Defunct newspapers published in New South Wales
Publications established in 1858
Publications disestablished in 1939
1858 establishments in Australia
1939 disestablishments in Australia
Wagga Wagga
Newspapers on Trove